Jonathan Goulet (born July 13, 1979) is a retired French Canadian mixed martial artist. A professional from 2001 until 2010, Goulet fought in the UFC. He earned his nickname, "The Road Warrior," after taking a fight on very short notice, traveling to the fight venue without his trainers or cornermen. During his career he was noted for his ever-changing hair colors and using his hair to advertise sponsors.

Background
Goulet is from Quebec, Canada and began training in Kenpo Karate when he was 14 years old but does not hold a high rank in the martial art. Goulet also began Brazilian jiu-jitsu when he was 20. Before becoming a professional fighter, Goulet worked in construction and also as a bouncer. It was during his time working as a bouncer at 20 years of age, when he began to pursue MMA fighting. Goulet had removed one man from the bar he was working at, but afterwards was "jumped" by four of the man's friends, who badly beat the young Goulet. After this incident, Goulet decided to make sure that nothing like that would ever happen again, and began training more in the martial arts with his first coach Steve Claveau and his team Legion.

Mixed martial arts career

Early career
Goulet made his professional mixed martial arts debut in 2001 and fought almost exclusively in his home country of Canada, with notable wins over Tony Fryklund, Shonie Carter and John Alessio, before being signed by the UFC.

Jonathan began as an amateur fighter after 5 months of training and got 10 wins before he started his professional career which did start well. He fought at 205, 185 and 170 where he got 8 wins before reaching the UFC

Ultimate Fighting Championship
Taking a 13-5 MMA record to the UFC, Goulet was successful in his debut, earning a TKO victory over Jay Hieron. His second UFC fight, however, did not go his way. He was knocked out in 6.06 seconds by Duane Ludwig which remained the quickest knockout in the history of the organization until July 6, 2019.

Goulet rebounded and came back to win a majority decision over The Ultimate Fighter 2 fan favourite, Luke Cummo, at ''Ultimate Fight Night 5.
Goulet was then submitted due to strikes by Josh Koscheck at UFC Fight Night 6 and was submitted by Dustin Hazelett at UFC Fight Night 11.

Goulet then put together back to back wins in the UFC, first submitting Paul Georgieff in December 2007, and then winning via TKO over Kuniyoshi Hironaka and UFC 83.

Goulet fought at UFC: Fight For The Troops, taking on Mike Swick, where he lost via KO in the first round.

Most recently, Goulet took on Marcus Davis at UFC 113 in Montreal, and lost in the second round via TKO. He was released from the organization after his loss to Davis along with Paul Daley and Kimbo Slice.

Post-UFC
Goulet fought Canadian prospect, Matt MacGrath at Ringside MMA 8: Invasion in Quebec, Canada on August 7, 2010. Goulet defeated MacGrath at 1:39 of the first round by TKO (punches).

Goulet faced Chris Clements on November 13, 2010 in Montreal, Quebec, Canada for the Ringside MMA Welterweight Championship. Goulet lost the fight via devastating knockout due to punches in the second round. After this fight, Goulet announced his retirement from MMA.

Championships and accomplishments
King of the Cage
KOTC Welterweight Championship (One time)
Ultimate Fighting Championship
Fight of the Night (Two times) vs. Luke Cummo, Kuniyoshi Hironaka

Mixed martial arts record

|-
| Loss
| align=center| 23–12 (1)
| Chris Clements
| KO (punches)
| Ringside MMA: Payback
| 
| align=center| 2
| align=center| 1:06
| Montreal, Quebec, Canada
| 
|-
| Win
| align=center| 23–11 (1)
| Matt MacGrath
| TKO (punches)
| Ringside 8
| 
| align=center| 1
| align=center| 1:39
| Quebec City, Quebec, Canada
| 
|-
| Loss
| align=center| 22–11 (1)
| Marcus Davis
| TKO (punches)
| UFC 113
| 
| align=center| 2
| align=center| 1:23
| Montreal, Quebec, Canada
| 
|-
| Loss
| align=center| 22–10 (1)
| Mike Swick
| KO (punches)
| UFC: Fight for the Troops
| 
| align=center| 1
| align=center| 0:33
| Fayetteville, North Carolina, United States
| 
|-
| Win
| align=center| 22–9 (1)
| Kuniyoshi Hironaka
| TKO (punches)
| UFC 83
| 
| align=center| 2
| align=center| 2:07
| Montreal, Quebec, Canada
| Fight of the Night.
|-
| Win
| align=center| 21–9 (1)
| Paul Georgieff
| Submission (rear-naked choke)
| The Ultimate Fighter 6 Finale
| 
| align=center| 1
| align=center| 4:42
| Las Vegas, Nevada, United States
| 
|-
| Win
| align=center| 20–9 (1)
| Dan Chambers
| TKO (punches)
| Xtreme MMA 2: Gold Rush
| 
| align=center| 1
| align=center| 2:23
| Victoriaville, Quebec, Canada
| 
|-
| Loss
| align=center| 19–9 (1)
| Dustin Hazelett
| Submission (armbar)
| UFC Fight Night 11
| 
| align=center| 1
| align=center| 1:14
| Las Vegas, Nevada, United States
| 
|-
| Win
| align=center| 19–8 (1)
| Cory MacDonald
| TKO (corner stoppage)
| KOTC: Supremacy
| 
| align=center| 1
| align=center| 5:00
| Halifax, Nova Scotia, Canada
| 
|-
| Loss
| align=center| 18–8 (1)
| Jason Day
| Submission (armbar)
| UCW 8: Natural Invasion
| 
| align=center| 2
| align=center| 1:22
| Winnipeg, Manitoba, Canada
| 
|-
| Win
| align=center| 18–7 (1)
| Travis Axworthy
| KO (head kick)
| TKO 29: Repercussion
| 
| align=center| 1
| align=center| 0:08
| Montreal, Quebec, Canada
| 
|-
| Win
| align=center| 17–7 (1)
| Jesse Bongfeldt
| KO (punches)
| TKO: MMA 2007 Tourney
| 
| align=center| 1
| align=center| 3:52
| Victoriaville, Quebec, Canada
| 
|-
| NC
| align=center| 16–7 (1)
| Thomas Schulte
| No Contest 
| TKO 28: Inevitable
| 
| align=center| 1
| align=center| 5:00
| Montreal, Quebec, Canada
| 
|-
| Loss
| align=center| 16–7
| Josh Koscheck
| TKO (Submission to punches)
| UFC Fight Night 6
| 
| align=center| 1
| align=center| 4:10
| Las Vegas, Nevada, United States
| 
|-
| Win
| align=center| 16–6
| Luke Cummo
| Decision (unanimous)
| UFC Fight Night 5
| 
| align=center| 3
| align=center| 5:00
| Las Vegas, Nevada, United States
| 
|-
| Loss
| align=center| 15–6
| Duane Ludwig
| KO (punch)
| UFC Fight Night 3
| 
| align=center| 1
| align=center| 0:11
| Las Vegas, Nevada, United States
| 
|-
| Win
| align=center| 15–5
| Shonie Carter
| Submission (bulldog choke)
| TKO 23: Extreme
| 
| align=center| 1
| align=center| 3:05
| Victoriaville, Quebec, Canada
| 
|-
| Win
| align=center| 14–5
| Jay Hieron
| TKO (doctor stoppage)
| UFC Fight Night 2
| 
| align=center| 3
| align=center| 1:05
| Las Vegas, Nevada, United States
| 
|-
| Win
| align=center| 13–5
| Kyle Jensen
| Submission (kimura)
| TKO 21: Collision
| 
| align=center| 1
| align=center| 1:46
| Montreal, Quebec, Canada
| 
|-
| Win
| align=center| 12–5
| Tony Fryklund
| TKO (cut)
| TKO 20: Champion vs. Champion
| 
| align=center| 1
| align=center| 1:16
| Montreal, Quebec, Canada
| 
|-
| Win
| align=center| 11–5
| John Alessio
| Decision (unanimous)
| TKO 18: Impact
| 
| align=center| 3
| align=center| 5:00
| Montreal, Quebec, Canada
| 
|-
| Win
| align=center| 10–5
| Joey Brown
| KO (knee)
| TKO 17: Revenge
| 
| align=center| 1
| align=center| 0:07
| Victoriaville, Quebec, Canada
| 
|-
| Win
| align=center| 9–5
| Travis Galbraith
| Submission (rear-naked choke)
| TKO 16: Infernal
| 
| align=center| 1
| align=center| 1:21
| Quebec City, Quebec, Canada
| 
|-
| Win
| align=center| 8–5
| Antoine Coutu
| TKO (slam)
| TKO: FutureStars
| 
| align=center| 1
| align=center| N/A
| Victoriaville, Quebec, Canada
| 
|-
| Win
| align=center| 7–5
| Alex Gasson
| Submission (rear-naked choke)
| TKO 15: Unstoppable
| 
| align=center| 1
| align=center| 1:43
| Montreal, Quebec, Canada
| 
|-
| Win
| align=center| 6–5
| Jeff Joslin
| Decision (unanimous)
| TKO 14: Road Warriors
| 
| align=center| 2
| align=center| 5:00
| Victoriaville, Quebec, Canada
| 
|-
| Loss
| align=center| 5–5
| Kaipo Kalama
| KO (punch)
| SB 30: Collision Course
| 
| align=center| 1
| align=center| 0:12
| Honolulu, Hawaii, United States
| 
|-
| Loss
| align=center| 5–4
| Brendan Seguin
| TKO (punches)
| Extreme Challenge 49
| 
| align=center| 3
| align=center| 0:46
| Davenport, Iowa, United States
| 
|-
| Win
| align=center| 5–3
| Jason Rigsby
| KO (kick)
| Extreme Challenge 49
| 
| align=center| 1
| align=center| 0:22
| Davenport, Iowa, United States
| 
|-
| Win
| align=center| 4–3
| Alexandre Daoust
| Submission (rear-naked choke)
| UCC Proving Ground 8
| 
| align=center| 1
| align=center| 1:00
| Victoriaville, Quebec, Canada
| 
|-
| Win
| align=center| 3–3
| Aime Henripin
| TKO (punches)
| UCC Proving Ground 7
| 
| align=center| 1
| align=center| 0:28
| Victoriaville, Quebec, Canada
| 
|-
| Loss
| align=center| 2–3
| Yan Pellerin
| TKO (punches)
| UCC Proving Ground 6
| 
| align=center| 1
| align=center| 3:10
| Montreal, Quebec, Canada
| 
|-
| Loss
| align=center| 2–2
| Tony Fryklund
| KO (punches)
| UCC 8: Fast and Furious
| 
| align=center| 1
| align=center| 3:45
| Rimouski, Quebec, Canada
| 
|-
| Win
| align=center| 2–1
| Robin Dionne
| Submission (armbar)
| UCC Proving Ground 4
| 
| align=center| 1
| align=center| 1:49
| Victoriaville, Quebec, Canada
| 
|-
| Win
| align=center| 1–1
| Mark Colangelo
| Submission (armbar)
| UCC 7: Bad Boyz
| 
| align=center| 1
| align=center| 4:36
| Montreal, Quebec, Canada
| 
|-
| Loss
| align=center| 0–1
| James Gabert
| TKO (punches)
| UCC Proving Ground 2
| 
| align=center| 1
| align=center| 4:07
| Saint-Jean-sur-Richelieu, Quebec, Canada
|

References

External links
 
 
 "Jonathan Goulet - The Quest to be The Best" by T. Gerbasi
 Jonathan Goulet's post-UFN 5 Video Interview (French)
 Jonathan Goulet 6 Video highlight (Credits to Jonathan Goulet)

1979 births
Canadian male mixed martial artists
French Quebecers
Living people
Canadian male karateka
Canadian practitioners of Brazilian jiu-jitsu
People from Victoriaville
Sportspeople from Quebec
Welterweight mixed martial artists
Mixed martial artists utilizing American Kenpo
Mixed martial artists utilizing Brazilian jiu-jitsu
Ultimate Fighting Championship male fighters